Page Industries Limited is an Indian manufacturer and retailer of innerwear, loungewear and socks, headquartered in Bangalore. It is the exclusive licensee of Jockey International in India, Sri Lanka, Nepal, Bangladesh, the United Arab Emirates, Oman, Qatar, Maldives and Bhutan. In 2011, it licensed Speedo swimwear from Pentland Group for India and Sri Lanka.

The company was founded in 1994 by Sunder Genomal and his brothers Nari and Ramesh, and together they hold a 54% stake in it. It has 9 operational manufacturing plants in Bangalore, and 1 each in Hassan, Mysore, Tiptur, Gauribidanur, Mandya and Tiruppur.

References

External links
 

Clothing companies of India
Clothing companies established in 1994
Companies based in Bangalore
Indian companies established in 1994
1994 establishments in Karnataka
Companies listed on the National Stock Exchange of India
Companies listed on the Bombay Stock Exchange